The Antilles Air Command is a disbanded United States Air Force unit.  Its last assignment was with Sixth Air Force, based at Borinquen Field, Puerto Rico, where it was inactivated on 25 August 1946.

Engaged in antisubmarine operations, 1941–1945. Inactivated 1946.

History

Lineage
 Constituted as the Antilles Air Task Force on 20 February 1943
 Activated on 1 March 1943
 Redesigned Antilles Air Command c. 1 June 1943
 Inactivated on 25 August 1946
 Disbanded on 8 October 1948

Assignments
 Sixth Air Force, 20 February 1943 – 25 August 1946

Stations
 San Juan, Puerto Rico, 1 March 1943
 Borinquen Field, Puerto Rico, 1 March 1943 – 25 August 1946

Components
 Trinidad Wing, 1 March 1943 – 15 March 1944
 4th Tactical Reconnaissance Squadron, 11 July 1941 – 29 March 1942
 Attached to Puerto Rican Department: 29 March 1942-23 March 1943
 Attached to Antilles Air Task Force: 23 March-1 June 1943
 Assigned to Antilles Air Command: 1 July 1943-25 August 1946
 23d Antisubmarine Squadron:
 Attached to Trinidad Wing, Antilles Air Command: 5 August–December 1943
 32d Fighter Squadron: 3 August 1943 – 13 March 1944
 59th Bombardment Squadron: 19 March-26 April 1943
 Detached to 25th Bombardment Squadron: 26 April-1 August 1943
 91st Reconnaissance Squadron
 Attached: 26 July-21 October 1948
 Assigned: 21 October 1948-22 January 1949
 101st Bombardment (Photographic) Squadron
 Attached to Trinidad Sector and Base Command, 6 August 1942-1 June 1943
 Assigned to Antilles Air Command: 1 June 1943-15 March 1944

References

Notes

Bibliography

 

United States Army Air Force Commands
Military units and formations established in 1943
Military units and formations disestablished in 1946
Military history of British Guiana during World War II